David Wolfe is a mathematician and amateur Go player.

Education and career
Wolfe graduated from Cornell University in 1985, with a bachelor's degree in electrical engineering. He obtained a Ph.D. in computer science from the University of California, Berkeley in 1994, with a dissertation Mathematics of Go: Chilling Corridors combining both subjects and supervised by Elwyn Berlekamp.

After working as a lecturer at the University of California, Berkeley from 1991 to 1996, as an associate professor at Gustavus Adolphus College from 1996 to 2008, and then as an adjunct faculty member at Dalhousie University, he moved from academia to the software industry.  Wolfe was a fan of Martin Gardner and in 2009 he teamed up with Tom M. Rodgers to edit a Gardner tribute book.

Books
Wolfe is the author of books on combinatorial game theory, including:
Mathematical Go: Chilling Gets the Last Point (with Elwyn Berlekamp, A K Peters, 1994; also published as Mathematical Go Endgames: Nightmares for the Professional Go Player, Ishi Press, 1994)
Lessons in Play: An Introduction to Combinatorial Game Theory (with Michael H. Albert and Richard Nowakowski, A K Peters, 2007; 2nd ed., CRC Press, 2019)

References 

Combinatorial game theorists
Living people
Year of birth missing (living people)
Place of birth missing (living people)
Nationality missing
American Go players
Go (game) writers
Cornell University alumni
UC Berkeley College of Engineering alumni
University of California, Berkeley faculty
Gustavus Adolphus College faculty
Academic staff of the Dalhousie University